Naggar is a surname. Naggar, al-Naggar, el-Naggar, etc. may refer to the following notable people:

Ahmad Ibrahim al-Sayyid al-Naggar
Ahmed El-Nagar, Egyptian boxer
Carole Naggar, poet, historian, curator, and painter
Chris Naggar (born 1997), American football player
Mostafa Alnagar
Reut Naggar
Zaghloul El-Naggar

See also
 Najjar